In mathematical analysis, nullclines, sometimes called zero-growth isoclines, are encountered in a system of ordinary differential equations

  

 

The equilibrium points of the system are located where all of the nullclines intersect.
In a two-dimensional linear system, the nullclines can be represented by two lines on a two-dimensional plot; in a general two-dimensional system they are arbitrary curves.

History 

The definition, though with the name ’directivity curve’, was used in a 1967 article by Endre Simonyi.  This article also defined 'directivity vector' as
,
where P and Q are the dx/dt and dy/dt differential equations, and i and j are the x and y direction unit vectors.

Simonyi developed a new stability test method from these new definitions, and with it he studied differential equations. This method, beyond the usual stability examinations, provided semi-quantitative results.

References

Notes
 E. Simonyi – M. Kaszás: Method for the Dynamic Analysis of Nonlinear Systems, Periodica Polytechnica Chemical Engineering – Chemisches Ingenieurwesen, Polytechnical University Budapest, 1969

External links
 
 SOS Mathematics: Qualitative Analysis

Differential equations